Mark Geoffrey Hunt (born 5 October 1969) is an English former professional footballer who played as a forward in the Football League.

References
Mark Hunt, Neil Brown

1969 births
Living people
English footballers
Association football forwards
Rochdale A.F.C. players
English Football League players
People from Farnworth